The Scotland national under-21 football team, controlled by the Scottish Football Association, is Scotland's national under 21 football team and is considered to be a feeder team for the Scotland national football team.

As a European under-21 team, Scotland compete in the UEFA European Under-21 Championship, which is usually held every other year. The team has qualified for the final stages of these Championships on six occasions, although not since 1996. There is no global tournament for under-21 national teams. Performance in the European Championship determines qualification for football at the Summer Olympics, which Scotland is unable to compete in.

History
Scotland played under-23 international matches, mainly friendlies against England and Wales, from 1955 until 1975. Scotland first entered the UEFA competition for under-23 national teams in 1975–76. Scotland reached the quarter-finals, but were eliminated on a penalty shootout by the Netherlands. An under-21 team then came into existence, replacing the under-23 team, when UEFA reduced the age limit.

Scotland under-21s have reached the last four of the European tournament three times (1982, 1992 and 1996), while appearing in the quarter finals on three other occasions (1980, 1984 and 1988). The team qualified for the 1992 Summer Olympics and 1996 Summer Olympics, but were unable to compete due to Scotland not being independently represented in the International Olympic Committee. The under-21 team has not qualified for a finals tournament since the late 1990s. They reached the playoff round for the 2004 and 2011 tournaments, but lost to Croatia and Iceland respectively.

In 2018, an under-21 squad returned to the Toulon Tournament. Despite the loss to Turkey in a penalty-out for third-place. Scotland did receive the tournament Fair Play Award.

Competitive record
 Champions   Runners-up   Third place   Fourth place   Tournament held on home soil

UEFA European U-21 Championship Record 

*Denotes draws include knockout matches decided by a penalty shootout.

Other tournaments

*Denotes draws include knockout matches decided by a penalty shootout.

Head coaches

Archie Knox left his post as Scotland's National Youth Teams Coach on 30 August 2007 to take up a full-time with Bolton Wanderers as coaching co-ordinator, Maurice Malpas took temporary charge. In January 2008 the SFA appointed a new full-time coach in Billy Stark, who left his job as manager of Second Division side Queen's Park to take the position. Stark resigned from the position in November 2014.

Players

Leading appearances

Leading goalscorers

Eligibility
The team is for players born in the year 21 years before the starting year of each tournament. As each tournament normally takes two years to complete, players can continue to play for the under-21 team after their 22nd birthday. As long as they are eligible, players can play at any level, making it possible to play for the under-21s, senior side and then return to the under-21 side. It is now also possible to play for one country at youth level and another country at senior level (providing the player is eligible). For instance, Nigel Quashie played for England under-21s and Scotland. Until the late 1980s, teams were allowed to select some over-age players in the under-21 team, similar to the present arrangement in football at the Summer Olympics.

Current squad
The following players were selected for friendly matches against Sweden and Wales in March 2023.

Caps and goals updated as of 17 November 2022, after the match against Iceland. Clubs correct as of 16 March 2023.

Recent call-ups
The following players have also been called up to the Scotland under-21 squad and remain eligible (current clubs shown).

Past squads
1996 European Championship squad

Notes

References

External links
 SFA (under 21s)
 Uefa Under-21 website Contains full results archive
 Complete U21 results and player statistics at FitbaStats
 Complete U23 results and player statistics at FitbaStats

European national under-21 association football teams
F